Maureen Heppell is a female former international table tennis player from England.

Table tennis career
She represented England at the 1967 World Table Tennis Championships in the Corbillon Cup (women's team event) with Karenza Smith and Mary Shannon-Wright.

Personal life
Her father Len Heppell (a ballroom dancer) helped train Pop Robson after Robson had met Maureen on the table tennis circuit. Len went on to help many leading football players and managers and Maureen married Robson.

See also
 List of England players at the World Team Table Tennis Championships

References

English female table tennis players
1949 births
Living people